The Neil P. Anderson Building is an 11-story building located at 411 West Seventh Street in Fort Worth, Texas. Built in 1921, it had served as a cotton exchange for the Neil P. Anderson Cotton Co. The building was designed by Sanguinet & Staats. In 1977, an insurance company which owned the building planned to demolish it.  In the last minute a group of investors purchased the building in order to save it.  It was added to the National Register on March 8, 1978.  The Trammel Crow Co. purchased the building in 2000. In 2004, the building was converted into luxury condos.  It was renamed the Neil P. at Burnett Park.

Photo gallery

See also

National Register of Historic Places listings in Tarrant County, Texas
Recorded Texas Historic Landmarks in Tarrant County

References

External links

Fort Worth Architecture: The Neil P. at Burnett Park

National Register of Historic Places in Fort Worth, Texas
Buildings and structures in Fort Worth, Texas
Sanguinet & Staats buildings
Recorded Texas Historic Landmarks
Chicago school architecture in Texas